Emberger is a German language habitational surname. Notable people with the name include:
 Dick Emberger (1938), American athlete
 Louis Emberger (1897–1969), French botanist and phytogeographer

References 

German-language surnames
German toponymic surnames
Surnames of Austrian origin